3oclockreep is a 2008 album from Paul Westerberg. It includes material recorded with The Replacements for 1989's Don't Tell a Soul. The album was released on September 1, 2008, on TuneCore for $3.99; users could also purchase the tracks separately for $3.00 and 99 cents respectively.

Track listing
"3oclockreep" – 26:15
"Finally Here Once" – 3:00

While 30clockreep does not have an official track listing for the title track, a tentative one has been made:
"Tell 'Em All, Go to Hell" 2:49
"Mash of Outtakes" 0:44
"It's Ridiculous, Everybody Wants to Be Famous" 2:53
"Only Excuse Is" 2:15
"You're Still Mine" 1:05
"If Only You Were Lonely" 1:00
"Studio Ramblings" 1:15
"We Know the Night" 3:06
"Lowdown Monkey Blues" 5:08
The latter four feature Tom Waits.

Personnel

Chris Mars – drums
Slim Dunlap – lead guitar
Tommy Stinson – bass guitar
Tom Waits – vocals
Paul Westerberg – vocals and guitar

References

External links
Download page from TuneCore

2008 albums
Albums produced by Matt Wallace
Paul Westerberg albums
Self-released albums
The Replacements (band) albums